HMS Dover was a 40-gun fourth-rate frigate of the Royal Navy, originally built for the navy of the Commonwealth of England at Shoreham by William Castle, and launched in 1654. By 1677, her armament had been increased to 48 guns.

At the Battle of Solebay of 1672, Dover, commanded by John Ernle, saved Sir John Harman and the Charles from a fire ship.

Dover was rebuilt for the first time in 1695 at Portsmouth, from where she relaunched as a 50-gun fourth-rate ship of the line. She underwent a second rebuild in 1716.

Notes

References

Lavery, Brian (2003) The Ship of the Line – Volume 1: The development of the battlefleet 1650–1850. Conway Maritime Press. .

Ships of the line of the Royal Navy
Ships built in England
1650s ships